Chitinimonas prasina is a Gram-negative, green pigmented, aerobic bacterium species from the genus of Chitinimonas which has been isolated from lake water in Xiamen in the Fujian Province in China.

References

Further reading 
 

Burkholderiaceae
Bacteria described in 2014